The 2018 season for the  cycling team will begin in January at the Tour Down Under. As a UCI WorldTeam, they will be automatically invited and obligated to send a squad to every event in the UCI World Tour.

Team roster

Riders who joined the team for the 2018 season

Riders who left the team during or after the 2017 season

Season victories

National, Continental and World champions 2018

Footnotes

References

AG2R-La Mondiale
AG2R Citroën Team
2018 in French sport